ELO Part II was a band formed by Electric Light Orchestra drummer and co-founder Bev Bevan. The band also included former ELO bassist and vocalist Kelly Groucutt, and violinist Mik Kaminski for most of its career, along with conductor Louis Clark who toured as a guest with ELO in its later years.

After Bevan left the band in late 1999, he sold his half of the rights to the Electric Light Orchestra name back to Jeff Lynne, and the band changed its name to The Orchestra.

History

Formation
In 1988 drummer Bev Bevan approached Jeff Lynne, wanting to record another ELO album. Lynne declined to participate, so Bevan signaled that he intended to continue the band without him. Lynne, however, objected over use of the ELO name, and the final agreement reached between the two resulted in ELO officially disbanding and Bevan forming a new band in 1989 called Electric Light Orchestra Part Two.
Another term of the agreement was that Lynne would get a percentage of ELO Part II's record royalties. Original ELO co-founder Roy Wood was approached about joining the band, but declined. Bevan recruited longtime ELO string conductor and co-arranger Louis Clark into his new band, but not as an official member (Clark was never an official member of the original ELO either.) The first line-up comprised Bevan, plus three musicians completely unrelated to ELO: Eric Troyer (keyboards and vocals), Peter Haycock (guitar and vocals) and Neil Lockwood (guitar and vocals). John Payne had also been recruited as a member early on but dropped out, eventually to join Asia in 1991, and Jim Steinman was also in the frame at the beginning as producer before himself leaving the project but suggesting his friend Troyer as a possible member.

Debut album
ELO Part Two released a self-titled album in 1991 which featured former ELO violinist Mik Kaminski on one track. The album was intended to hark back to ELO's classic sound of the mid-to-late 1970s, but compared to the original ELO being under the creative control initially of both Wood and Lynne and then Lynne after Wood's departure, ELO Part II were more democratic in terms of songwriting and lead vocals.

The first tour featured the band performing live with the 80-piece Moscow Symphony Orchestra (MSO) conducted by Konstantin Krimets, and was well received in the UK. The band chose MSO so they could have a western band playing with an eastern orchestra. Approximately two-thirds of the songs performed were ELO hits. The tour's set was designed by Tom McPhillips and included the ELO spaceship. The show in ELO's home town of Birmingham was captured on video and on the live album with the long-winded title Performing ELO's Greatest Hits Live Featuring The Moscow Symphony Orchestra. Kaminski, former ELO cellist Hugh McDowell, and former ELO bassist Kelly Groucutt were part of the live band, with Groucutt sharing lead and backing vocals with Troyer, Haycock and Lockwood. Kaminski, McDowell and Groucutt were initially appearing as guest artists from a band they had formed called OrKestra, itself a vehicle to exploit their past association with ELO, but eventually dissolved it and joined ELO Part Two full-time by 1993. McDowell's tenure with the band was short. ELO Part II and MSO planned to kick off their tour in the USA at Radio City Music Hall. But the tour was cancelled as costs became prohibitive.

The band continued to tour Germany and the UK in 1992 with Louis Clark playing keyboards to emulate the strings of the absent orchestra. In 1993 Haycock and Lockwood left the band, and were replaced by guitarist/vocalist Phil Bates, who had been in the band Trickster, one of the opening acts for ELO's 1978 world tour. A world tour was undertaken by ELO Part Two in 1993, including dates in the USA and Eastern Europe.

Moment of Truth

Now a six-piece band with a slightly altered name, Electric Light Orchestra Part II recorded a second studio album, Moment of Truth, which was released in 1994. The success of the album and the single "One More Tomorrow" were determining factors if the band would re-establish themselves in the US. The album was not a commercial success. The band continued its tour schedule over the following years, sometimes augmenting the core band with a backing orchestra. On these rare occasions they hired local orchestras at each venue to cut down costs.
Another live album with the Australian Rock Orchestra was recorded in Sydney, Australia in March 1995 and was released the following year in Germany as a double album One Night, and the year after that in the USA as a single album One Night - Live in Australia. The band sold the master tapes of this album and it has since been remixed, remastered, and re-released several times under different titles.

Later career and transition to The Orchestra

Phil Bates remained with the band until January 1999 and was replaced by Parthenon Huxley (guitar, vocals). 
In November 1999 Bevan played his last show with the band at the Sands Hotel in Atlantic City and issued a press release in early 2000 indicating that ELO Part II had split. Due to Bev Bevan selling his rights to the ELO name to Jeff Lynne the band could not continue under the name ELO Part II.

The remaining members, however, recruited drummer Gordon Townsend and decided to continue as The Orchestra who continue to tour up to the present day.

Personnel

Members
Bev Bevan – drums, percussion, backing vocals (1989–2000; ELO member 1970–1986)
Louis Clark – keyboards, orchestra arranger and conductor (1989–2000; ELO associate 1974-1980, 1983, Non-member touring musician 1981-1982, 1986; died 2021)
Eric Troyer – keyboards, vocals, guitar (1989–2000)
Pete Haycock – guitar, bass guitar, vocals (1989–1993; died 2013)
Neil Lockwood – guitar, vocals (1989–1993)
Mik Kaminski – violin (1991, 1992–2000; ELO member 1973-1979, Non-member touring musician 1982, 1986)
Kelly Groucutt – bass guitar, vocals (1991, 1992–2000; ELO member 1975-1983; died 2009)
Hugh McDowell – cello (1991; ELO member 1972, 1973–1979; died 2018)
Phil Bates – guitar, vocals (1993–1999)
Parthenon Huxley – guitar, vocals (1999–2000)

Timeline

Discography

Studio albums

Compilation albums

Live albums

Singles

Music videos

Videos
Performing ELO's Greatest Hits Live Featuring The Moscow Symphony Orchestra (VHS), (1992)
Electric Light Orchestra - Part II - One Night Live in Australia '95 (DVD), (1995)
Access All Areas (DVD/VHS), (1997) Produced and Directed by George Reed.  Running time 58 minutes.  Feature includes interviews with band members, live performances, music videos for "All Fall Down" and "Ain't Necessarily So" as well as behind the scenes footage.

References

External links
http://www.elodiscovery.com ELO & Jeff Lynne information page
Under London Skies - unofficial fanzine for The Orchestra, the band formerly known as ELO Part II.
ELO Fans.com - discussion for fans of the Electric Light Orchestra, ELO Part II and The Orchestra.

1989 establishments in England
2000 disestablishments in England
Electric Light Orchestra
Musical groups from Birmingham, West Midlands
Musical groups established in 1989
Musical groups disestablished in 2000
Scotti Brothers Records artists